Ruøya is an island in Aure Municipality in Møre og Romsdal county, Norway.  It is connected to the village of Aure on the mainland to the east by the Aursund Bridge and to the island of Rottøya to the south by the Smalsund Bridge.  The large island of Ertvågsøya lies to the west.

See also
List of islands of Norway

References

Aure, Norway
Islands of Møre og Romsdal